Carlo Davies (born 15 July 1898) was an Anglo-Italian footballer who played for Inter Milan. Born in Milan, he was the son of Samuel Richard Davies.

References
RSSSF
inter.it archive

1898 births
Inter Milan players
Year of death missing
Italian footballers
Association football defenders
Italian people of English descent